Justis Huni (born 4 April 1999) is an Australian professional boxer. He has held the Australian heavyweight title since 2020. As an amateur, he won a bronze medal at the 2019 World Championships.

Early life
Huni was born on 4 April 1999 in Meadowbrook, a suburb of Logan City, in the metropolitan area of Brisbane, Queensland. He is of Tongan, Swedish, Samoan and Dutch descent. His first sporting love was rugby league where he began playing for the Souths Sunnybank Magpies as a child but gave away the sport at the age of eight to pursue a career in boxing.

Amateur career

World Championships result
Yekaterinburg 2019
First round: Defeated Cristian Salcedo (Colombia) 5–0
Second round: Defeated Nigel Paul (Trinidad and Tobago) RSC
Quarter-finals: Defeated Mahammad Abdullayev (Azerbaijan) 5–0
Semi-finals: Defeated by Kamshybek Kunkabayev (Kazakhstan) W/O

Professional career

Early career
On 22 October 2020, Huni made his professional debut against Australian heavyweight champion, Faiga Opelu. Huni dominated throughout the bout and in the seventh round, he secured victory after his opponent's corner threw in the towel to protect Opelu from further damage.

On 3 December 2020, Huni fought for the second time as a professional against Arsene Fosso. After controlling the opening three rounds, referee Phil Austin called a halt to the fight in the fourth round after Fosso took a number of heavy blows from Huni.

Huni had three more professional fights in the first half of 2021, knocking out Jack Maris on 10 April and defeating Christian Tsoye by unanimous decision on 26 May to retain his Australian heavyweight title. His most publicised fight took place on 16 June, when Huni entered the ring against ex-rugby league player, turned professional boxer, Paul Gallen. In what was a bruising encounter, Huni controlled the fight and overcame his 39-year-old opponent in the 10th round after knocking him to the ground. The referee declared the fight over with Huni improving his record to 5-0 while handing Gallen his first defeat. 

Huni was set to represent Australia at the 2020 Summer Olympics in Tokyo in the super-heavyweight division but was ruled out due to injury.

Professional boxing record

References

External links

1999 births
Living people
Australian male boxers
Boxers from Brisbane
AIBA World Boxing Championships medalists
Super-heavyweight boxers
Australian people of Dutch descent
Australian sportspeople of Samoan descent
Australian people of Swedish descent
Australian sportspeople of Tongan descent